Roy Bradshaw may refer to:

 Roy Bradshaw (geographer) (born 1943), English professor of geography
 Roy Bradshaw (figure skater), British figure skater